Wang Guanghua (born January 1963) is a Chinese politician who is the current minister of natural resources, in office since June 2022.

Biography
Wang was born in Xingyang County (now Xingyang), Henan, in January 1963. After resuming the national college entrance examination, in 1979, he entered Peking University, majored in economic geography. 

He joined the Chinese Communist Party (CCP) in December 1987. He served in various posts in the  before serving as deputy director of the Cadastral Management Division of the Ministry of Land and Resources in July 1998, and director in September 2014, interspersed with five years as director of Wuhan Bureau of the State Land Supervision from December 2008 to December 2013. In July 2015, he became vice minister of natural resources, rising to minister in June 2022.

In October 2022, Wang was elected as a full member of the 20th Central Committee of the Communist Party of China.

References

1963 births
Living people
People from Xingyang
Peking University alumni
Ministers of Natural Resources of the People's Republic of China
People's Republic of China politicians from Henan
Chinese Communist Party politicians from Henan